Tonning is a Norwegian surname. Notable people with the surname include:

Knud Karl Krogh-Tonning (1842–1911), Norwegian theologian
Kristian Tonning Riise (born 1988), Norwegian politician
Peder Tonning (1782–1839), Norwegian politician

Norwegian-language surnames